Pompey, otherwise known as Pompey the Great, was a Roman statesman.

Pompey may also refer to:

People
 Sextus Pompey, son of Pompey the Great
 Pompeia gens, other people whose name, "Pompeius", may be rendered as "Pompey"

Athletes
 Adam Pompey (born 1998), New Zealand professional rugby league footballer
 Aliann Pompey (born 1978), Guyanese sprinter
 Dalton Pompey (born 1992), Canadian baseball player
 Fred Elliott (footballer) (1879–1960), Australian rules footballer in the Victorian Football League with the nickname Pompey
 Tristan Pompey (born 1997), Canadian baseball player
 Yolande Pompey (1929–1979), boxer from Trinidad & Tobago

Military figures
 Harold Edward Elliott (1878–1931), Australian World War I general nicknamed Pompey
 Pompey Factor (1849–1928), United States Army Indian Scout

Other people
 Tali Tali Pompey (1940s–2011), Aboriginal artist from central Australia

Places
 HMNB Portsmouth, nicknamed Pompey, a naval base in the city of Portsmouth, England
 Portsmouth, nicknamed Pompey, a city on the south coast of England

Pompey, Meurthe-et-Moselle, a town in Meurthe-et-Moselle department, Lorraine, France
Pompey, New York, a town in Onondaga County, New York, United States
 Theatre of Pompey, the first permanent theatre to be built in Rome

Animals
 Pompey (dog), the dog of William The Silent, the Prince of Orange
Pompey (horse), American champion racehorse

Arts, entertainment, and media
Pompey, a 1993 novel by Jonathan Meades
Pompey, a character in The Man Who Shot Liberty Valance, played by Woody Strode
Pompey, a character in the webcomic The Order of the Stick
Pompey Bum, a character in Measure for Measure by William Shakespeare
 Gnaeus Pompeius Magnus (character of Rome), character in the television series Rome

Sports
 Portsmouth F.C., a professional association football club in the city of Portsmouth, England, formed in 1898 and nicknamed Pompey
The Pompey Chimes, a football chant used by Portsmouth F.C. supporters
 Royal Artillery (Portsmouth) Football Club, an 1890s British Army amateur association football club in the city of Portsmouth, England, nicknamed Pompey

Other uses
Pompey, northern England slang for a prison
 Pompeian, Inc., a food company
 Pompeian era, a calendar era

See also 
Pompeii (disambiguation)
Pompeia (disambiguation)
Pompeius (disambiguation)
Pompee (disambiguation)